Becky Measures (born 13 October 1981 in Derbyshire, England), from Bakewell, Derbyshire, is a freelance radio presenter and a professional charity fund-raiser.

She is a regular cover presenter on BBC Radio Sheffield. Before this, she was the host of the breakfast show on Peak FM, an independent local radio station in Derbyshire.

Before radio, she held a variety of jobs including being an extra for the locally filmed television series Peak Practice before moving into radio.

In 2004, Measures, then 23, decided to have a double mastectomy after a genetic test revealed that she had an 80 to 90 per cent risk of developing breast cancer. Both her mother and a cousin, Helen, had suffered from the same illness.

To help raise funds to build Europe's first breast cancer prevention centre, she organised a calendar of tasteful, naked photographs of different local people including members of Chesterfield FC.

On 6 June 2006, ITV broadcast a documentary entitled My Breasts or My Life about Measures and her decision to have her breasts removed. The programme, filmed over two years, follows the decision and preparation for the operation as well as her, and her family's, feelings afterwards.

In October 2006, a book detailing her life, decision and operation was published called No Big Deal by Peak FM Newsreader Simon Towers on Boltneck Publishings; a song bearing the same title was also released in February 2007 by Ovacast featuring Becky on vocals. It has reached #67 on the UK Singles Chart.

Measures was for a time a volunteer dog walker for the Chesterfield & North Derbyshire Branch of the RSPCA, and was a guest judge at their Fun Dog Show on 17 June 2007.

External links
Becky Measures' homepage
Becky Measures page on the Peak FM website
Matlock Mercury article about double breast mastectomy decision - 28 October 2004, Retrieved 24 May 2006
Becky Measures on BBC Radio 4's Woman's Hour

1981 births
English radio presenters
Living people